Bernard Marie Descoings (7 September 1931 – 23 October 2018) is a French botanist. He specialized in tropical plants in Africa (Madagascar, Cote d'Ivoire, Gabon) and South America (French Guiana), and had a special interest in the kalanchoes of Madagascar.

References 

20th-century French botanists
1931 births
2018 deaths